Fluoroboric acid or tetrafluoroboric acid (archaically, fluoboric acid) is an inorganic compound with the simplified chemical formula . The term "fluoroboric acid" refers to a range of chemical compounds, depending on the solvent. The  in the simplified formula of fluoroboric acid represents the solvated proton. The solvent can be any suitable Lewis base. For instance, if the solvent is water, fluoroboric acid can be represented by the formula  (oxonium tetrafluoroborate), although more realistically, several water molecules solvate the proton: . The ethyl ether solvate is also commercially available, where the fluoroboric acid can be represented by the formula , where n is most likely 2.

It is mainly produced as a precursor to other fluoroborate salts. It is a strong acid. Fluoroboric acid is corrosive and attacks the skin. It is available commercially as a solution in water and other solvents such as diethyl ether. It is a strong acid with a weakly coordinating, non-oxidizing conjugate base. It is structurally similar to perchloric acid, but lacks the hazards associated with oxidants.

Structure and production 
Pure  has been described as a "nonexistent compound", as a sufficiently "naked" proton is expected to abstract a fluoride from the tetrafluoroborate ion to give hydrogen fluoride and boron trifluoride:

Although the solvent-free  has not been isolated, its solvates are well characterized. The anion and cations are strongly hydrogen-bonded.

Three equivalents of HF react to give the intermediate boron trifluoride and the fourth gives fluoroboric acid:

Anhydrous solutions can be prepared by treatment of aqueous fluoroboric acid with acetic anhydride.

Acidity
The acidity of fluoroboric acid is complicated by the fact that its name refers to a range of different compounds, e.g. The aqueous pKa is quoted as −0.44. Its acidity is thus comparable to that of fluorosulfonic acid.

Applications 
Fluoroboric acid is the principal precursor to fluoroborate salts, which are typically prepared by treating the metal oxides with fluoroboric acid. The inorganic salts are intermediates in the manufacture of flame-retardant materials and glazing frits, and in electrolytic generation of boron.  is also used in aluminum etching and acid pickling.

Organic chemistry 
 is used as a catalyst for alkylations and polymerizations. In carbohydrate protection reactions, ethereal fluoroboric acid is an efficient and cost-effective catalyst for transacetalation and isopropylidenation reactions. Acetonitrile solutions cleave acetals and some ethers. Many reactive cations have been obtained using fluoroboric acid, e.g. tropylium tetrafluoroborate, triphenylcarbenium tetrafluoroborate, triethyloxonium tetrafluoroborate, and benzenediazonium tetrafluoroborate.

Electroplating
Fluoroboric acid is also used for high-speed electroplating of copper in fluoroborate baths.

Safety
 is toxic and attacks skin and eyes. It attacks glass. It hydrolyzes, releasing corrosive, volatile hydrogen fluoride.

Other fluoroboric acids
A series of fluoroboric acids is known in aqueous solutions. The series can be presented as follows:
 (hydrogen tetrahydroxyborate) (not a fluoroboric acid)
 (hydrogen fluoro(trihydroxy)borate)
 (hydrogen difluoro(dihydroxy)borate)
 (hydrogen trifluoro(hydroxy)borate)
 (hydrogen tetrafluoroborate)

See also
 Fluorosulfuric acid
 Fluoroantimonic acid

References

Further reading

External links 
 

Tetrafluoroborates
Mineral acids